Cleopatra I Syra (Greek: Κλεοπάτρα ἡ Σύρα; c. 204 – 176 BC) was a princess of the Seleucid Empire, Queen of Ptolemaic Egypt by marriage to Ptolemy V of Egypt, and regent of Egypt during the minority of their son, Ptolemy VI, from her husband's death in 180 BC until her own death in 176 BC.

Life
Cleopatra I was the daughter of Antiochus III the Great, King of the Seleucid Empire, and Queen Laodice III.

Queen
In 197 BC, Antiochus III had captured a number of cities in Asia Minor previously under the control of the Ptolemaic Kingdom of Egypt. The Romans supported the Egyptian interests, when they negotiated with the Seleucid king in Lysimachia in 196 BC. In response, Antiochus III indicated his willingness to make peace with Ptolemy V and to have his daughter Cleopatra I marry Ptolemy V. They were betrothed in 195 BC and their marriage took place in 193 BC in Raphia. At that time Ptolemy V was about 16 years and Cleopatra I about 10 years old. Later on, Egypt's Ptolemaic kings were to argue that Cleopatra I had received Coele-Syria as her dowry and, therefore, this territory again belonged to Egypt. It is not clear if this was the case.  However, in practice, Coele-Syria remained a Seleucid possession after the Battle of Panium in 198 BC.

In Alexandria, Cleopatra I was referred to as the Syrian. As part of the Ptolemaic cult she was honoured with her husband as Theoi Epiphaneis. In line with ancient Egyptian tradition of sibling marriage, she was also named sister (adelphḗ) of Ptolemy V. A synod of priests held at Memphis in 185 BC granted Cleopatra all the honours that had been given to Ptolemy V in 196 BC (inscribed on the bilingual Greek-Egyptian Rosetta stone).

Queen Regent
Ptolemy V died unexpectedly in September 180 BC, at the age of only 30. Cleopatra I's son, Ptolemy VI, who was only six years old, was immediately crowned king, with Cleopatra as co-regent. She was the first Ptolemaic queen to rule without her husband. In documents from this period, Cleopatra is named Thea Epiphanes and her name appears before Ptolemy. Coins were minted under the joint authority of her and her son.

Just before his death, Ptolemy V had been planning a new war against the Seleucid kingdom, but Cleopatra immediately ended the war preparations and pursued a peaceful policy, because of her own Seleucid roots and because a war would have threatened her hold on power. Cleopatra probably died in late 178 or early 177 BC, though some scholars place her death in late 176 BC.

On her deathbed, Cleopatra appointed Eulaeus and Lenaeus, two of her close associates as regents.  Eulaeus, a eunuch, who had been the Ptolemy's tutor. Lenaeus was a Syrian slave who had probably come to Egypt as part of Cleopatra's retinue when she got married. The pair were unable or unwilling to prevent the deterioration of relations with the Seleucid kingdom which culminated in the disastrous Sixth Syrian War.

Issue
Cleopatra and Ptolemy V had three children:

Trivia
On June 22, 2010, archaeologists uncovered a gold coin bearing Cleopatra's image at Tel Kedesh in Israel near the Lebanon border. It was reported to be the heaviest and most valuable gold coin ever found in Israel.

Notes

Works cited

References
 Stähelin, Kleopatra 14). In: Realencyclopädie der Classischen Altertumswissenschaft, vol. XI 1, 1921, col. 738–740.
 Werner Huß, Ägypten in hellenistischer Zeit (Egypt in the Hellenistic Period). Munich 2001, p. 499; 514f.; 535; 537–540.
 Günther Hölbl, Geschichte des Ptolemäerreichs (History of the Ptolemaic Empire). Darmstadt 1994, p. 125; 127f.; 147f.; 153.

2nd-century BC Pharaohs
2nd-century BC women rulers
Queens consort of the Ptolemaic dynasty
Ancient Egyptian queens regnant
2nd-century BC Egyptian people
200s BC births
176 BC deaths
Seleucid princesses
Female pharaohs
2nd-century BC Egyptian women